Blanche of Navarre (1226 – 12 August 1283), also known as Blanche of Champagne, was the daughter of Theobald the Troubador, King of Navarre and Count of Champagne, and his second wife Agnes of Beaujeu. She was a member of the House of Champagne. By her marriage to John I, Duke of Brittany, she became Duchess consort of Brittany.

Life
Blanche was firstly betrothed to Otto III, Count of Burgundy; the marriage contract was signed on 16 January 1236. However, the engagement was broken.

Blanche was instead married in 1236 to John I, Duke of Brittany: the main reason he married Blanche was so he could get Navarre, and Theobald did make John heir to the throne. However, John renounced the claim after Margaret of Bourbon bore Theobald two sons.

Marriage and children
Blanche and John had:
John II, Duke of Brittany
Peter of Brittany (2 April 1241–Paris, 19 October 1268), Lord of Hade
Alix of Brittany, Dame de Pontarcy
Theobald (1245–1256), died young
Theobald (died soon after birth)
Eleanor (1248), died young
Nicholas (1249–1261), died young
Robert (1251–1259), died young

Of their eight children, only their eldest three lived to adulthood.

In 1270 Blanche founded the Abbey de la Joie near Hennebont; she was later buried there. She died in 1283; her husband outlived her by three years. Blanche outlived six of her eight children.

Notes

References

 

1226 births
1283 deaths
Duchesses of Brittany
Navarrese infantas
House of Blois
13th-century Breton people
13th-century French women
13th-century nobility from the Kingdom of Navarre
Daughters of kings